1670 Broadway, formerly Amoco Tower, is a  tall skyscraper in Denver, Colorado. It was completed in 1980 and has 36 floors. Kohn Pedersen Fox Associates PC designed the building and it is the 11th tallest skyscraper in Denver.

The 1670 Broadway building features, along with the tenants, a Starbucks coffee shop, a Russell's Convenient Store, and a UMB Bank. UBS purchased the building in 1990. In 2006, TIAA-CREF became one of the building's biggest tenants, and the company's symbol now adorns the top of the structure.

In August 2018, Korean asset manager Hana Financial Group acquired the building for $238 million. The company received $78 million in CMBS financing from UBS and $64.8 million in mezzanine financing to fund the acquisition.

See also
List of tallest buildings in Denver

References

External links
1670 Broadway Website
Emporis
Skyscraperpage

Skyscraper office buildings in Denver
Office buildings completed in 1980
Kohn Pedersen Fox buildings
Leadership in Energy and Environmental Design basic silver certified buildings